The 2021 BMW PGA Championship was the 67th edition of the BMW PGA Championship, an annual golf tournament on the European Tour, held 9–12 September at the West Course of Wentworth Club in Virginia Water, Surrey, England, a suburb southwest of London.

Billy Horschel won the event, carding a final-round 65 to finish one shot ahead of Kiradech Aphibarnrat, Laurie Canter and Jamie Donaldson. It was his second European Tour victory.

Course layout

Field

Past champions in the field

Made the cut

Missed the cut

Nationalities in the field

Round summaries

First round
Thursday, 9 September 2021

Second round
Friday, 10 September 2021

Third round
Saturday, 11 September 2021

Final round
Sunday, 12 September 2021

References

External links
Coverage on European Tour official site
Wentworth Club: Golf

BMW PGA Championship
Golf tournaments in England
BMW PGA Championship
BMW PGA Championship
BMW PGA Championship